The Mohammad Al-Amin Mosque, also referred to as the Bahwan mosque after its private financiers, is located in Bausher, Oman. It was inaugurated in 2014.

Construction 
Mohammed Al Ameen Mosque is a marble-clad marvel located off the Southern Expressway, at a height of 62.5 metres above sea level in Oman. Construction of the mosque commenced in the year 2008 and was completed in 2014. The construction activity brought together designers, materials, technologies, artists and suppliers from Iran, Italy, Germany, Austria, India and the UK. It rests on an area of 20,300 sq. m. The main Prayer Hall is 1616 sq. m. and can accommodate 2,100 people. The Chandeliers – Main Prayer Hall is 11-metre tall and the Ladies Prayer Hall is 4.5 meter tall, are finished with 24-karat gold plating and Swarovski crystals. The Mosque has a total of 3000 sq.m. of hand carved works-of-art in stone in the form of Islamic patterns and calligraphy.

The interior spaces feature a contemporary Omani style with rich carved woods accenting white marble.

See also

 List of mosques in Oman

References

Mosques in Oman
Buildings and structures in Muscat, Oman
Mosque buildings with domes
Culture in Muscat, Oman
Tourist attractions in Muscat, Oman
Ibadi mosques
Sultan Qaboos
Buildings and structures in Oman
Tourist attractions in Oman
Mosques completed in 2014
2014 establishments in Oman